David Warren "Dave" Cuddy (born September 16, 1952) is a businessman and Republican Party politician from the U.S. state of Alaska.

David Warren Cuddy was born in Anchorage, Alaska to Daniel Hon "Dan" and Betty Jane "Betti" (née Puckett) Cuddy.  He was named after his uncle (and Dan Cuddy's only sibling), who died in World War II in 1944.  Growing up in Anchorage (where he has lived for most of his life), he graduated from West Anchorage High School in 1970, and went on to earn a B.A. in economics from Duke University in 1974.

Cuddy joined the business operated by his family, First National Bank of Anchorage (now called First National Bank Alaska) in 1972, working his way up from teller to loan officer, and eventually vice-president at the time he left the bank. Cuddy was elected to a single term in the Alaska House of Representatives in 1980. A combination of redistricting and pressure from Dick Randolph to defect to the Libertarian Party played heavily in his decision not to run for re-election. In 1996 and 2008, Cuddy unsuccessfully challenged Ted Stevens in the Alaska Republican U.S. Senate primary.

Cuddy lists his occupation as an independent film producer. In 2001, he worked for a California-based entertainment firm as a business consultant to independent filmmakers, and left them in 2003.  While acting as executive producer on the film Light in the Forest, he met Austin-based screenwriter Bonnie Orr, and in 2007 he began construction of a film studio in Austin, Texas.

See also
 1996 United States Senate election in Alaska
 2008 United States Senate election in Alaska

References

External links
 Dave Cuddy for U.S. Senate, official campaign website
 David Cuddy at 100 Years of Alaska's Legislature

1952 births
American bankers
American film producers
Businesspeople from Anchorage, Alaska
Duke University Trinity College of Arts and Sciences alumni
Living people
Republican Party members of the Alaska House of Representatives
Politicians from Anchorage, Alaska